The men's 1500 metres event at the 2005 Summer Universiade was held on 16–18 August in Izmir, Turkey.

Medalists

Results

Heats

Final

References
Finals results
Full results
Heats results

Athletics at the 2005 Summer Universiade
2005